The 1977 WCT World Doubles was a men's tennis tournament played on indoor carpet courts in Kansas City, United States that was part of the 1977 World Championship Tennis circuit. It was the tour finals for the doubles season of the WCT Tour. The tournament was held from May 4 through May 8, 1977.

Final

Doubles

 Vijay Amritraj /  Dick Stockton defeated  Vitas Gerulaitis /  Adriano Panatta 7–6, 7–6, 4–6, 6–3

World Championship Tennis World Doubles
1977 World Championship Tennis circuit
1977 in sports in Missouri